Omalium rivulare is a species of ocellate rove beetle in the family Staphylinidae.

References

Further reading

External links

 

Omaliinae
Beetles described in 1789